O Descobrimento do Brasil is a 1936 Brazilian adventure film directed by Humberto Mauro and starring Alvaro Costa, João de Deus, and Manoel Rocha.

Cast
Alvaro Costa as Pedro Álvares Cabral
João de Deus as Ayres Correa
Manoel Rocha as Pero Vaz Caminha
Alfredo Silva as Henrique de Coimbra
De Los Rios as Duarte Pacheco
Arthur Oliveira as Pedro Escobar
J. Silveira as Alfredo Cunha
Hélio Barroso as Edgar
Armando Duval as Nicolau Coelho / Bartolomeu Dias

References

External links
 

1936 films
1936 adventure films
Brazilian adventure films
Films directed by Humberto Mauro
Brazilian black-and-white films
Age of Discovery films
1930s Portuguese-language films
Epic films